Guilty as Charged was an annual professional wrestling pay-per-view (PPV) event produced by Extreme Championship Wrestling (ECW) held annually in January from 1999 to 2001. The 2001 event was ECW's last pay-per-view before declaring bankruptcy.

Dates, venues and main events

References

ECW Guilty as Charged